The Dungeon is a 1922 race film directed, written, produced and distributed by Oscar Micheaux, considered the African-American Cecil B. DeMille due to his prolific output of films during the silent era, one of his greatest works being Body and Soul (1924). The Dungeon was his first horror effort, an early blaxploitation take on the Bluebeard legend.

Micheaux was criticized by D. Ireland Thomas, a columnist with the Chicago Defender, for his casting of light-skinned African Americans who could pass for white, attempting to make his films more commercially successful. Thomas questioned whether Micheaux was "relying on his name alone to tell the public that it is a race production; or maybe he is after booking it in white theaters."

No print of the film is known to exist and it is presumed to be a lost film.

Plot
The film focuses on Myrtle Downing, an African-American woman who is coerced into marrying a corrupt would-be politician named Gyp Lassiter even though she is really in love with Stephen Cameron, a young lawyer. When she discovers that her husband has conspired to support segregationist policies in exchange for support by white political power brokers, she objects to his crooked dealings and gets herself imprisoned in a secret dungeon where her husband had murdered his previous wives.

Cast
 Shingzie Howard as Myrtle Downing
 William Fountaine as Stephen Cameron
 J. Kenneth Goodman as Gyp Lassiter 
 William Crowell
 Earle Browne Cook
 Blanche Thompson

References

External links

1922 films
Lost American films
Films directed by Oscar Micheaux
American black-and-white films
American silent feature films
Race films
1920s American films
Silent horror films